The AN/SPY-3 is an active electronically scanned array radar manufactured by Raytheon and designed for both blue-water and littoral operations.

Technology

X band functionality (8 to 12 GHz frequency range) is optimal for minimizing low-altitude propagation effects, narrow beam width for best tracking accuracy, wide frequency bandwidth for effective target discrimination, and the target illumination for SM-2 and Evolved Sea Sparrow Missiles (ESSM). The X-band has, in general, favorable low-altitude propagation characteristics, which readily support the horizon search functionality of the AN/SPY-3. A large operating bandwidth is required to mitigate large propagation variations due to meteorological conditions.

The system uses commercial off the shelf (COTS) computers and has reduced manning requirements for operation and maintenance. A number of operation and maintenance functions can be completely automated. Commercial IBM Regatta series symmetric multiprocessor (SMP) servers, ruggedized for the shipboard environment, provide the low-latency computing throughput (rapid sensor-to-shooter loop closure) and high productivity software engineering environment.

The system was introduced in the new s and s. On both of these classes, the AN/SPY-3 was originally to be combined with the S Band AN/SPY-4 under the designator "Dual Band Radar". In June 2010, Pentagon acquisition chief Ashton Carter announced that they will be removing the SPY-4 S-band Volume Search Radar from the DDG 1000's dual-band radar to reduce costs as part of the Nunn-McCurdy certification process. Due to the SPY-4 removal, SPY-3 radar is to have software modifications so as to perform a volume search functionality. 

Shipboard operators will be able to optimize the SPY-3 MFR for either horizon search or volume search. While optimized for volume search, the horizon search capability is limited. Without the VSR, DDG-1000 is still expected to perform local area air defense.  aircraft carrier will be the only ship to have both radars married in one system. 

AN/SPY-3 was also under consideration for retrofit to existing ships (and s), as well for installation in future LH(X) .

Replacement 

See also
 DD(X)
 CG(X)
 Sea-based X-band Radar
 Phased array
 Active electronically scanned array
 Active phased array radar
 AN/SPY-6
 EL/M-2248 MF-STAR
 OPS-24
 OPS-50
 SAMPSON
 Selex RAT-31DL
 Selex RAN-40L

References

Sea radars
Military radars of the United States
Military electronics of the United States
Missile defense
Naval radars
Military equipment introduced in the 2010s